The Daily Courant, initially published on 11 March 1702, was the first British daily newspaper. It was produced by Elizabeth Mallet at her premises next to the King's Arms tavern at Fleet Bridge in London. The newspaper consisted of a single page, with advertisements on the reverse side. Mallet advertised that she intended to publish only foreign news and would not add any comments of her own, supposing her readers to have "sense enough to make reflections for themselves".

After only forty days Mallet sold The Daily Courant to Samuel Buckley, who moved it to premises in the area of Little Britain in London, at "the sign of the Dolphin". Buckley later became the publisher of The Spectator. The Daily Courant lasted until 1735, when it was merged with the Daily Gazetteer.

References

Citations

Bibliography

1702 establishments in England
Defunct newspapers published in the United Kingdom
Publications established in 1702
Publications disestablished in 1735
Newspapers published in London